August Gustafsson Lohaprasert (born 3 September 1993), sometimes spelled August Gustavsson Lohaprasret, is a Thai professional footballer of Swedish descent who plays as a midfielder for Qviding FIF.

Personal life
August was born in Göteborg. His father is Thai and his mother is Swedish.

References

External links
 

1993 births
Living people
Footballers from Gothenburg
Swedish people of Thai descent
August Gustafsson Lohaprasert
Swedish footballers
August Gustafsson Lohaprasert
Association football midfielders
GAIS players
August Gustafsson Lohaprasert
August Gustafsson Lohaprasert
August Gustafsson Lohaprasert
August Gustafsson Lohaprasert
Thai expatriate footballers
Thai expatriate sportspeople in Sweden
Expatriate footballers in Sweden